Ulleung County – a South Korean county
Ulleungdo – a South Korean island
Ulleung Basin – an oceanic basin located near Ulleungdo